Sagaponack  is a village in the Town of Southampton in Suffolk County, on the East End of Long Island, in New York, United States. The population of the village was 770 at the 2020 census.

History 
The area was first settled around 1653. The village was incorporated on September 2, 2005, in the wake of the failed attempt by Dunehampton, New York to incorporate. Dunehampton's incorporation would have blocked Sagaponack from beaches on the Atlantic Ocean. The villages are seeking to address various beach issues including erosion arising from groynes at Georgica Pond in East Hampton village.

Prior to its incorporation, Sagaponack was a census-designated place, with a population at the 2000 census of 582 for an area 70% greater than that of the current village.

The name Sagaponack comes from the Shinnecock Nation's word for "land of the big ground nuts", in reference to the Ground Nut (Apios americana).  A common misconception is that the name referred to potatoes, the predominant crop grown by farmers who first settled the area. Many of the huge estates in the village were built on former potato fields. Its first settler was Josiah Stanborough in 1656. The village was originally called Sagg.

Sag Harbor, just north of Sagaponack, is believed to have derived its name from the village. West of Sagaponack is a place that the Native Americans called Mecox, now a hamlet on the west side of Sagaponack Lake in the CDP of Bridgehampton.

In July 2015, according to Business Insider, the 11962 ZIP Code encompassing Sagaponack was listed as the most expensive in the U.S., with a median home sale price of $5,125,000, rising to $8,500,000 in the end of the year.

The village was home to many writers and literary business persons beginning in the 1950s and 1960s, appreciated for its quiet and cheap community living.

Geography

Demographics

As of the census of 2000, there were 582 people, 249 households, and 162 families residing in the CDP. The population density was 93.6 people per square mile (36.1/km2). There were 734 housing units at an average density of 118.0 per square mile (45.6/km2). The racial makeup of the CDP was 92.78% White, 2.58% African American, 2.58% Asian, 1.55% from other races, and 0.52% from two or more races. Hispanic or Latino of any race were 3.44% of the population.

There were 249 households, out of which 24.9% had children under the age of 18 living with them, 55.0% were married couples living together, 6.8% had a female householder with no husband present, and 34.9% were non-families. Of all households 27.7% were made up of individuals, and 8.4% had someone living alone who was 65 years of age or older. The average household size was 2.34 and the average family size was 2.86.

In the CDP the population was spread out, with 19.4% under the age of 18, 4.0% from 18 to 24, 24.6% from 25 to 44, 33.8% from 45 to 64, and 18.2% who were 65 years of age or older. The median age was 46 years. For every 100 females, there were 102.1 males. For every 100 females age 18 and over, there were 101.3 males.

The median income for a household in the CDP was $54,048, and the median income for a family was $78,707. Males had a median income of $43,750 versus $27,321 for females. The per capita income for the CDP was $44,474. About 1.9% of families and 1.3% of the population were below the poverty line, including 2.5% of those under age 18 and 1.8% of those age 65 or over.

Government 
As of September 2022, the Mayor of Sagaponack is William F. Tillotson, the Deputy Mayor is Lisa Duryea Thayer, and the Village Trustees are William Barbour, Marilyn Clark, and Carrie Thayer Crowley.

Real estate 
Sagaponack is generally considered to be the most expensive neighborhood in the Hamptons, as well as in the United States as a whole, generally ranking in the top spot on all major surveys. The Sagaponack ZIP Code (11962) was listed as the most expensive in the United States in 2009, and several years thereafter including again in 2018; the median home sale price was $4,421,458, according to Zillow.com and $8.5 million according to PropertyShark. Nearby Water Mill (11976) was listed sixth with $2,238,676, and Bridgehampton (11932) was listed eighth with $2,081,717.

In 2015 and through to 2018, according to Business Insider, Sagaponack's 11962 ZIP Code was listed as the most expensive in the U.S., this time by real estate-listings site Property Shark, with a median home sale price of $5,125,000 in 2015 rising to $8.5 million in 2018, with the most expensive homes and recent sales being in and around Daniels Lane, generally considered Sagaponack’s priciest address and where Ira Rennert has the largest home in America, and side streets off of Daniels including Fairfield Pond Lane.

Statements opposing Ira L. Rennert's construction plans were given at the August 27, 1998 Board of Zoning Appeals hearing by Kurt Vonnegut and Andre Gregory, appalled at the board's acceptance of the 29-bedroom establishment as a "single-family house".

Many homes around the lanes in Sagaponack have become well-featured and instantly recognisable landmarks that define the vistas and landscape of the Hamptons. Notable iconic sights include the Sagg Store on Sagg Main Street, farm and modern houses along Daniels Lane, and Ira Rennert's home, Fairfield.

The Elizabeth Reese House designed by Andrew Geller is historically significant in architecture.

Education 
Sagaponack is located primarily within the Sagaponack Common School District, which consists of one school: the Sagaponack School. one of the last remaining active one-room schoolhouses in New York State. The building, known locally as the "Little Red School House," educates children from kindergarten through third grade.

After finishing 3rd grade, students attend either schools in the Bridgehampton, the East Hampton, or the Sag Harbor school districts for the remainder of their K-12 education.

Small portions of the village are also located within the boundaries of the Bridgehampton and Wainscott school districts.

Notable people 
 Charles Addams (1912–1988), cartoonist
 Drew Barrymore
 Lloyd Blankfein (born 1954), CEO, Goldman Sachs
 Susan Blond, publicist and Warhol movie star
 Truman Capote, author
 Jimmy Fallon (born 1974), television host
 Lewis Frankfort, CEO, Coach
 Jim Grabb (born 1964), tennis player ranked World No. 1 in doubles
 Billy Joel (born 1949), musician
 Caroline Kennedy (born 1957), former First Daughter, lawyer, author and diplomat
 Peter Matthiessen, author, conservationist and naturalist
 George Plimpton, author
 L.A. Reid, record company executive
 Ira Rennert, investor and businessman
 David Salle, artist
 Roy Scheider, actor
 Axel Stawski, billionaire real estate developer
 Kurt Vonnegut, author

The village is also well known as the summer residence of several current and former Goldman Sachs bankers and private equity professionals.

See also
Sagaponack Historic District – A historic district located within the village.

References

External links

Official website

Southampton (town), New York
Villages in New York (state)
Villages in Suffolk County, New York
Populated coastal places in New York (state)